Ncube  or Mncube is a very common surname among the Matabele and Zulu people of Southern Africa.

Notable people with the surname include:

 Abedinico Ncube (born 1954), Zimbabwean ZANU-PF politician placed on the United States sanctions list.
 Andile Ncube (born 1981), South African television host of The X Factor SA.
 Lieutenant Colonel Ben Ncube (born 1959), spokesperson for the Zimbabwe National Army.
 Busi Ncube (born 1963), Zimbabwean singer and musician.
 Butholezwe Ncube (born 1992), Zimbabwean association footballer.
 Carl Joshua Ncube (born 1979), Zimbabwean stand-up comedian and television producer.
 Cunningham Ncube (born 1990), Zimbabwean cricketer.
 Fletcher Dulini Ncube (1940–2014), former Zimbabwean MDC politician.
 Gugulethu Zuma-Ncube (born 1985), daughter of former South African president Jacob Zuma and daughter-in-law of Welshman Ncube.
 Japhet Ndabeni Ncube, former Mayor of Bulawayo.
 Lancelot Ncube (born 1996), Zimbabwe-born Swedish actor.
 Mduduzi Ncube (born 1988 or 1989), South African singer-songwriter.
 Professor Mthuli Ncube (born 1963), former chief economist and vice president of the African Development Bank.
 Ndabenkulu Ncube (born 1988), Zimbabwean association footballer.
 Ngonidzashe Ncube (born 1986), Zimbabwean long-distance runner.
 Njabulo Ncube (born 1989), Zimbabwean cricketer.
 Nobukhosi Ncube (born 1993), Zimbabwean association footballer.
 Nomusa Dube-Ncube, South African ANC politician and former diplomat.
 Owen Ncube (born 1968), Zimbabwean ZANU-PF politician placed on the United States sanctions and UK sanctions lists.
 Pilan Ncube (born 1983), international association football referee from Zimbabwe.
 Pius Ncube (born 1946), disgraced former archbishop of Bulawayo.
 Raphael Macebo Mabuza Ncube (born 1973), Zimbabwean Catholic bishop.
 Sello Maake kaNcube (born 1963), South African actor.
 Sethulo Ncube, commissioner at the Zimbabwe Human Rights Commission.
 Sister Bernard Ncube (1932–2012), former mayor of the West Rand region of Johannesburg, South Africa.
 Trevor Ncube (born 1962), Zimbabwean editor and publisher.
 Professor Welshman Ncube (born 1961), legal scholar and politician.

Bantu-language surnames
Zimbabwean surnames
Zulu-language surnames